Dean Lawford (born 9 May 1977) is an English former professional rugby league footballer who played in the 1990s and 2000s.

Background
Lawford was born in Dewsbury, West Yorkshire, England.

Career
Lawford was transferred from Dewsbury Moor to Sheffield Eagles in 1994, he was transferred from Sheffield Eagles to Leeds Rhinos in December 1996.

References

External links
(archived by web.archive.org) Profile at Leeds Rhinos official website

1977 births
Living people
Batley Bulldogs players
Bramley RLFC players
Dewsbury Rams players
English rugby league players
Halifax R.L.F.C. players
Huddersfield Giants players
Leeds Rhinos players
Rugby league halfbacks
Rugby league players from Dewsbury
Sheffield Eagles (1984) players
Widnes Vikings players